Flatt and Scruggs were an American bluegrass duo. Singer and guitarist Lester Flatt and banjo player Earl Scruggs, both of whom had been members of Bill Monroe's band, the Bluegrass Boys, from 1945 to 1948, formed the duo in 1948. Flatt and Scruggs are viewed by music historians as one of the premier bluegrass groups in the history of the genre. 

Flatt and Scruggs recorded and performed together until 1969. Their backing band, the Foggy Mountain Boys, included fiddle player Paul Warren, a master player in both the old-time and bluegrass fiddling styles whose technique reflected all qualitative aspects of "the bluegrass breakdown" and fast bowing style; dobro player Uncle Josh Graves, an innovator of the advanced playing style of the instrument now used in the genre; stand-up bass player Cousin Jake Tullock; and mandolinist Curly Seckler.

Biography
Lester Flatt worked for Monroe at the time Earl Scruggs was considered for Bill Monroe's band, the Blue Grass Boys, in 1945. The two left that band early in 1948, and within a few months had formed the Foggy Mountain Boys.  Flatt's rhythm-guitar style and vocals and Scruggs' banjo style gave them a distinctive sound that won them many fans. In 1955, they became members of the Grand Ole Opry.  Many of the songs on their albums are credited to "Certain and Stacey". These  songs were in fact written by Flatt, Scruggs, and various other members of the Foggy Mountain Boys. Certain and Stacey are the maiden names of the wives of Flatt and Scruggs (Louise Certain, wife of Earl Scruggs, and Gladys Stacey, wife of Lester Flatt).

Scruggs, who had always shown progressive tendencies, experimented on duets with saxophonist King Curtis and added songs by the likes of Bob Dylan to the group's repertoire. Flatt, a traditionalist, did not like these changes, and the group broke up in 1969.  Following the breakup, Lester Flatt founded the Nashville Grass and Scruggs led the Earl Scruggs Revue. Flatt died in 1979, at the age of 64. Flatt and Scruggs were elected to the Country Music Hall of Fame in 1985.

In 2003, they ranked No. 24 on CMT's 40 Greatest Men of Country Music, one of only four non-solo artists to make the list (The Eagles, Alabama, and Brooks & Dunn are the others).

Scruggs died from natural causes on March 28, 2012 in a Nashville hospital.

Members
 Lester Flatt (guitar)
 Earl Scruggs (banjo, guitar)
 Paul Warren (fiddle)
 John Ray "Curly" Seckler (mandolin, guitar)
 Josh Graves (Dobro, bass)
 English P. “Cousin Jake” Tullock (bass)
 Chubby Wise (fiddle)
 Jim Shumate (fiddle)
 Benny Martin (fiddle)
 Benny Sims (fiddle)
 Howdy Forrester (fiddle)
 Art Wooten (fiddle)
 Howard Watts aka "Cedric Rainwater" (bass)
 Charles Johnson aka "Little Jody Rainwater" (bass)
 Frank "Hylo" Brown (bass, guitar)
 Charles “Little Darlin’” Elza (bass)
 Joe Stuart (bass)
 Ernie Newton (bass)
 Bob Moore (bass)
 Everett Lilly (mandolin)
 Jim Eanes (guitar)
 Mac Wiseman (guitar)
 Billy E. Powers (guitar)
 Johnny Johnson (guitar)
 Earl Taylor (mandolin and harmonica)
 Grover C. Deskins Jr. (harmonica)

Notable songs
 "Foggy Mountain Breakdown": an instrumental originally released in 1949 and used in many rural car chase movie sequences, notably in Bonnie and Clyde. It has won two Grammy awards.
 "The Ballad of Jed Clampett" (listen): used as the theme for the Beverly Hillbillies television series.  The song reached No. 42 on the record charts during the series' debut season of 1962. The song hit No. 1 on the country charts in January 1963, and was the only number-one hit song of their career. The song is one of only five TV theme songs to ever reach No. 1 on the country charts.
 Martha White jingle (still used in advertising today).
 "Petticoat Junction": theme from the TV series.

Discography

Albums

Singles

References

1948 establishments in the United States
1969 disestablishments in the United States
American bluegrass music groups
American country music groups
Grammy Award winners
Musical groups established in 1948
Musical groups disestablished in 1969
Country Music Hall of Fame inductees